There's Something Wrong with the Children is a 2023 American horror film directed by Roxanne Benjamin and written by T. J. Cimfel and David White. The film stars Alisha Wainwright, Zach Gilford, Amanda Crew, and Carlos Santos. Jason Blum serves as an executive producer through his Blumhouse Television banner.

There's Something Wrong with the Children was released digitally in the United States on January 17, 2023, by Paramount Home Entertainment, and on March 17, 2023, by MGM+.

Plot
Margaret and Ben take a weekend trip with longtime friends Ellie and Thomas and their two young children. Eventually, Ben begins to suspect something supernatural is occurring when the kids behave strangely after disappearing into the woods overnight.

Cast
 Alisha Wainwright as Margaret
 Zach Gilford as Ben
 Amanda Crew as Ellie
 Carlos Santos as Thomas
 Briella Guiza as Lucy
 David Mattle as Spencer
 Ramona Tyler as Park Ranger

Production
In November 2021, There's Something Wrong with the Children was announced as part of Blumhouse Productions and Epix's movie deal, with Roxanne Benjamin directing with T. J. Cimfel & David White writing the screenplay, with Zach Gilford, Amanda Crew, Alisha Wainwright and Carlos Santos starring in the film.

Filming
Principal photography on the film began in November 2021 in New Orleans.

Release
There's Something Wrong with the Children was released digitally in the United States on January 17, 2023, by Paramount Home Entertainment, and on March 17, 2023, by MGM+.

Reception
 On Metacritic, the film has a weighted average score of 53 out of 100, based on 7 critics, indicating "mixed or average reviews".

Christian Zilko of IndieWire gave the film a grade of A-, writing: "While it's a premise we've seen many times before, [the film] punches above its weight by doing all the little things right." Randy Myers of The Mercury News gave it 3/4 stars, saying that director Roxanne Benjamin "never allows 'Children' to overstay its welcome, resulting in a scare package worth seeking out." Meagan Navarro of Bloody Disgusting gave the film 3/5 stars, writing: "While it isn't a complete reinvention of the subgenre, it offers enough fresh ideas to set this one apart from the pack."

Brian Tallerico of RogerEbert.com gave the film 2/4 stars, saying that it "takes WAY too long to get anywhere interesting—at times, it feels like a script that would have suited an anthology format like Guillermo del Toro's Cabinet of Curiosities better than a feature's length". Noel Murray of the Los Angeles Times wrote that the children "become fairly standard-issue devil-imps, causing damage that only occasionally seems personally targeted toward the grown-ups, in scenes too blandly reminiscent of dozens of other 'cabin in the woods' movies."

References

External links
 
 
 

2023 films
2023 horror films
American horror films
Blumhouse Productions films
MGM+ original films
Films directed by Roxanne Benjamin
Films shot in New Orleans
2020s English-language films